Salt Creek Township is one of the fifteen townships of Pickaway County, Ohio, United States.  The 2000 census found 2,655 people in the township, 2,357 of whom lived in the unincorporated portions of the township.

Geography
Located in the southeastern corner of the county, it borders the following townships:
Clearcreek Township, Fairfield County - north
Perry Township, Hocking County - east
Salt Creek Township, Hocking County - southeast corner
Colerain Township, Ross County - south
Green Township, Ross County - southwest corner
Pickaway Township - west
Washington Township - northwest corner

The farthest east township in Pickaway County, it is the only county township to border Hocking County.

The village of Tarlton is located in northern Salt Creek Township.

Name and history
It is one of five Salt Creek Townships statewide.

Government
The township is governed by a three-member board of trustees, who are elected in November of odd-numbered years to a four-year term beginning on the following January 1. Two are elected in the year after the presidential election and one is elected in the year before it. There is also an elected township fiscal officer, who serves a four-year term beginning on April 1 of the year after the election, which is held in November of the year before the presidential election. Vacancies in the fiscal officership or on the board of trustees are filled by the remaining trustees.

References

External links
County website

Townships in Pickaway County, Ohio
Townships in Ohio